No Man's Land is the second album by the Hieroglyphics sub-group Souls of Mischief, released in 1995. It was their final release under Jive Records. The first single was "Rock It Like That".

Track listing

Chart positions
 Billboard 200 No. 111
 Top R&B/Hip-Hop Albums No. 27

References

External links 
 No Man's Land Review at Discogs

1995 albums
Souls of Mischief albums
Jive Records albums
Albums produced by A-Plus (rapper)